Robert Lloyd Wenman (19 June 1940 – 14 June 1995) was a Progressive Conservative party member of the House of Commons of Canada. He was a businessman, investment counsellor and teacher by career.

Wenman was born in Maidstone, Saskatchewan and attended the University of Saskatchewan and various schools in the United States. In 1966, he became a member of British Columbia's provincial legislature for the Social Credit party, setting a record as youngest MLA at that time.

He was first elected at the Fraser Valley West riding in the 1974 federal election. He was re-elected in that riding four times, in 1979, 1980, 1984 and 1988. He left federal politics after this and did not campaign in the 1993 federal election.

Wenman died a few days before his 55th birthday.

References
 
 
 

1940 births
1995 deaths
British Columbia Social Credit Party MLAs
Members of the House of Commons of Canada from British Columbia
Progressive Conservative Party of Canada MPs
University of Saskatchewan alumni